Fairview, Page County is an unincorporated community in Page County, in the U.S. state of Virginia. In this community, there is a local general store, with a butchery, jams, honey, and interesting snacks. It is near Luray, Virginia also.

References

Unincorporated communities in Virginia
Unincorporated communities in Page County, Virginia